Hervartov is a village and municipality in Bardejov District in the Prešov Region of north-east Slovakia.

History
In historical records the village was first mentioned in 1406. The wooden church in the village was built around 1500 and is a Roman Catholic wooden church. It has beautiful frescoes inside and due to its cultural and historical value it was declared a UNESCO World Heritage Site in 2008.

Geography
It has a population of about 503 people.

Genealogical resources

The records for genealogical research are available at the state archive "Statny Archiv in Presov, Slovakia"

 Roman Catholic church records (births/marriages/deaths): 1749-1897 (parish B)
 Greek Catholic church records (births/marriages/deaths): 1819-1938 (parish B)

See also
 List of municipalities and towns in Slovakia

References

External links
 
 
Surnames of living people in Hervartov

Villages and municipalities in Bardejov District
Šariš